Osiyevskaya is a rural locality (a village) in Beketovskoye Rural Settlement, Vozhegodsky District, Vologda Oblast, Russia. The population was 13 as of 2002.

Geography 
Osiyevskaya is located 47 km northwest of Vozhega (the district's administrative centre) by road. Kubinskaya is the nearest rural locality.

References 

Rural localities in Vozhegodsky District